Tim Wynne-Jones,  (born 12 August 1948) is an English–Canadian author of children's literature, including picture books and novels for children and young adults, novels for adults,   radio dramas, songs for the CBC/Jim Henson production Fraggle Rock, as well as a children's musical and an opera libretto.

For his contribution as a children's writer he was Canada's nominee for the biennial, international Hans Christian Andersen Medal in 2012.

Biography
Born on August 12, 1948 in Bromborough, Cheshire, Great Britain, Wynne-Jones emigrated to Canada in 1952, and was raised in British Columbia and Ontario. He currently lives in Perth, Ontario.

Wynne-Jones was educated at the University of Waterloo and Yale University, after having graduated from Ridgemont High School in Ottawa, Ontario, Canada. An additional formative experience was his participation in the St Matthew's Anglican Church choir of men and boys, of which he was for a time the Head Chorister.   He is a faculty member at Vermont College of Fine Arts, teaching in the Writing for Children and Young Adults MFA program.

Writing 
Tim Wynne-Jones' first book was Odd's End which is said to have been written over the space of five weeks while his wife was away. It was published By McClelland & Stewart in 1980 and won the $50,000 Seal First Novel Award. Since then, Wynne-Jones has written more than 20 books, including picture books, novels for children and young adults, as well as three novels for adults. His work has been widely reviewed and he has won several awards, including two Boston Globe–Horn Book Awards from The Horn Book Magazine for children's fiction published in the U.S. (1995, 2011); three Governor General's Literary Awards in Canada (1993, 1995, 2009); three Canadian Library Association Prizes; the Arthur Ellis Award from the Crime Writers of Canada (2001); and the Edgar Award for Young Adult Mystery from the Mystery Writers of America (2002).

Works

Children's picture books
Madeline and Ermadillo - 1976
Zoom at Sea - 1983
Zoom Away - 1985
The Hour of the Frog - 1985
I'll Make You Small - 1986
Mischief City - 1986
Architect of the Moon - 1988 (U.S. title: Builder of the Moon)
Zoom Upstream - 1992
The Last Piece of Sky - 1993
Mouse In the Manger - 1993
The Hunchback of Notre Dame - 1996
Dracula - 1997
On Tumbledown Hill - 1998
Ned Mouse Breaks Away - 2002

Juvenile and Young adult fiction
Some of the Kinder Planets - 1993
Rosie Backstage - 1994 (with Amanda Lewis)
The Book of Changes - 1994
The Maestro - 1995 (Australian title: The Flight of Burl Crow, UK title The Survival Game)
Stephen Fair - 1998
Lord of the Fries and Other Stories - 1999
The Boy in the Burning House - 2000 (Edgar Award for Best Young Adult Novel, 2002)
A Midwinter Night's Dream - 2003 (Libretto, commissioned by the Canadian Children's Opera Chorus)
A Thief in the House of Memory - 2004
Rex Zero and the End of the World - 2007
Rex Zero, King of Nothing - 2008
The Uninvited - 2009
Rex Zero, the Great Pretender - 2010
Blink and Caution - 2011
The Emperor of Any Place - 2015
War at the Snow White Motel and Other Stories - 2020

Adult fiction
Odd's End - 1980
The Knot - 1983
Fastyngange - 1988 (UK title: Voices)
SilabGarza - 2010

Co-Authored
Click - 2007

Radio plays
"The Thinking Room" for CBC Radio's Nightfall - 1982
"The Road Ends at the Sea" for CBC Radio's Nightfall - 1982
"The Strange Odyssey of Lennis Freed" for CBC Radio's Nightfall - 1983

Awards
 1980 - Seal First Novel Award, Odd's End
 1983 - Ruth Schwartz Award of The Canadian Book Sellers Association, Zoom at Sea
 1993 - Governor General's Award for English language children's literature, Some of the Kinder Planets
 1995 - Boston Globe–Horn Book Award for children's fiction, Some of the Kinder Planets
 1995 - Governor General's Award for English language children's literature, The Maestro
 1995 - Canadian Library Association Young Adult Book of the Year, The Maestro
 1997 - Vicky Metcalf Award
 1998 - Canadian Library Association Children's Book of the Year
 2001 - Arthur Ellis Award, Best Juvenile Crime Book, The Boy in the Burning House
 2002 - Edgar Award for Best Young Adult book, The Boy in the Burning House
 2009 - Governor General's Award for English language children's literature, The Uninvited
 2011 - Officer of the Order of Canada "for his contributions to Canadian literature, notably as a writer of children's fiction".
 2011 - Boston Globe–Horn Book Award for children's fiction, Blink & Caution

References

See also
 List of University of Waterloo people

External links

 
 "Tim Wynne-Jones", cm archive feature story – Melanie Fogel, CM: A Reviewing Journal of Canadian Materials for Young People 16.6 (1988), University of Manitoba (archived 6 September 2001)
2011 interview at BookReviewsAndMore.ca
 
 

1948 births
Living people
Canadian children's writers
Canadian male novelists
Edgar Award winners
Governor General's Award-winning children's writers
Officers of the Order of Canada